Carlos Sadness (born 31 March 1987) is a Spanish singer, songwriter and illustrator.

Biography 
He started to study Design while he uploaded some of his songs onto Myspace.

After a few years of touring underground and getting a lot of visits and reproductions on his media profiles, he drew the attention of some media and publishers, becoming "one of the most important faces for 2009" as "El País" said. A few months later, he was making a song for the film Brain Drain. That year he worked with Fernando Vacas (music producer of Russian Red) looking for a different sound in new songs, opening the door to a new phase. Nowadays, he considers his first steps as entertainment and learning.

History 
In 2010 Carlos met his first manager Pito Cubillas (Alaska, Héroes del Silencio), with whom he travelled to Los Angeles, where a series of dreams made him discover a new way of composing his songs, based on the instrumentalization and influences of indie and folk music. During this year, Carlos was invited to participate in a tribute album to Antonio Vega, El alpinista de los sueños, in homage to Héroes del silencio, Hechizo, in the album of Luis Eduardo Aute, Intemperie. By the end of that year, he signed with Sony Music Entertainment.

In January 2011, he released his first EP Atraes a los relámpagos that helped position him in the national indie-pop scene. In November, he took part in El Intermedio, a Spanish TV programme of La Sexta channel, with a humorous sketch about Spanish politics and by the end of the year, he was nominated as "Best New Artist Record 2011" by Radio Televisión Española (RTVE).

In April 2012, he released his album Ciencias celestes and he finally used the name of Carlos Sadness. A personal and poetic album in which he musically reinvented himself without losing his personality. The day the album was released it appeared on the Spanish public TV channels (La 2 and 24 Horas). That year, the brand San Miguel Beer counted on him to star in its new advertising campaign "Ciudadanos en un lugar llamado mundo".

In 2015, he released his second album, La idea salvaje, and it was nº 1 in Fnac and ranked in 12th position in the list of the Spanish top sellers. The album was produced in Glasgow, Scotland, and counted with the collaboration of Santi Balmes and it is a conceptual album which turns around the idea of a space travel, as a metaphor for the estrangement between two people. For weeks, his songs were nº 1 in "shared songs" of Spotify and Sadness became one of the six indie artists with more influence on the Spanish summer festivals and closing almost every concert of his tour, including two dates in Madrid with sold out tickets: Teatro Barceló and Sala But. This same year, he was nominated in the ARC awards as “best tour of festivals” and in the VEVO Awards in the category of Spanish music video for “Bikini”.

In 2016, he extended his tour to more than 60 concerts and he was also part of more than 20 festivals while he was writing his first book Anatomías Íntimas, launched in November. The book was the most pre-ordered book in Fnac from the announcement to its launching. That year was also his debut in Mexico, and he reached something that no other artist had reached in his first visit: sold-out in Lunario in a matter of minutes and not only once, but three consecutive times. Those events attracted the attention of the Mexican media and festivals, where he was invited to perform the following year.

In 2017, Sadness released a single with which he became the first Spanish “indie” artist to exceed the 600,000 monthly playbacks on Spotify. He played in Vive Latino and did an American tour with 10 concerts. His song "Amor Papaya" with Caloncho was the most listened-to Spanish indie song in Spotify in 2017.

Currently, in 2018, the singer has published the album ‘Diferentes Tipos de Luz’, which started with the advance of ‘Hale Bopp’  on 12 January of this year and with the release of the single ‘Longitud de Onda’ on 2 February. The scheduled release date was on 23 February, tickets for the concert in La Riviera Madrid were sold out two months before.

Sadness' song "Aloha" was featured in the soundtrack of the video game FIFA 21.

Style and influences 

His lyrics were born from the experience of what he dreams and lives, built with a fantastic and imaginative character. Barcelona and the North of Huesca are some of the places where he finds inspiration. In fact, he affirms to have imagined many of his lyrics in those places. The trailer Monteperdido and allusions to Montjuic shallow hill and Tibidabo mountain in his album “La idea salvaje” are a clear example of this.

His musical taste includes groups such as Death Cab For Cutie, Simon and Garfunkel, Los Piratas or Joy Division. Munch, Kafka or the impressionist authors are examples of his cultural preferences. As it can be seen on Instagram or Facebook, he is one of the most followed indie artists on social networks.

His song "Hoy es el día" was used for Walmart's spring-summer advertising campaign in the United States. He was also one of the artists of the advertising spot of San Miguel beer in 2012.

In 2009, he shared stage with Katy Perry in the Palau Sant Jordi in Barcelona and in the Palacio de los Deportes in Madrid. He also shared stage with the Spanish singer Bebe in her 2010–2011 tour.

Other activities 

Before he fully engaged in music, he worked as an illustrator and as an advertising designer. While working in advertising agencies, he did works for trademarks such as White Label, Eristoff Black or Carolina Herrera.

In 2016, his book Anatomías Íntimas was published. In his book, he fuses his facets as illustrator and writer; he found the way to weave texts, ideas, memories, songs and illustrations. Since the announcement of the date of publication, the book remained at the top of Fnac’s list of reserved books.

In 2016, he wrote a preface about the different points of view about love for the book Los novios de Gael of Sanz i Vila  published by Ediciones Hidravión.

Discography 

As Carlos Sadness

As Shinoflow

Books

Notable collaborations

Singles / Videoclips

References

External links 
 Reseña de Diferentes tipos de luz en Jenesaispop
 Reseña de La idea salvaje en Jenesaispop
 Reseña de Ciencias celestes en Jenesaispop
 Crónica presentación en Razzmatazz de Diferentes tipos de luz en Jenesaispop
 Artículo de El Periódico sobre la campaña San Miguel 2012
 Reportaje diario El País
Official Web Page
 Carlos Sadness on Twitter
 Carlos Sadness on Facebook

Singers from Barcelona
Spanish-language singers
Singer-songwriters from Catalonia
Spanish male singer-songwriters
Spanish singer-songwriters
Sony Music Spain artists
1987 births
Living people